Sh! Women's Erotic Emporium is a British sex shop with an East End of London retail boutique and online store. It was started in 1992 by Kathryn Hoyle and Sophie Walters.

Cultural impact

In 1992, Hoyle discovered the Rabbit vibrator named “Roger Rabbit” in a sex toy warehouse. She branded hers "Jessica Rabbit,” which became renowned from its appearance on television shows, including Sex and the City. After Cosmopolitan ran an article on female masturbation in 1999, sales increased.

Projects
Sh! runs educational workshops and collaborates with National Health Service Trusts in providing sex toys for women with sexual difficulties.

2003 International Sexology Conference

In 2003, Adeola Agbebiyi from the Barts and the London NHS Trust, and Kathryn Hoyle and Angel Zatorski both from Sh! Women's Emporium, presented two papers exploring the relationship between women and sex toys.

Awards
Sh! has been awarded Ethical Consumer status by ethicalconsumer.org for their informed and information-giving standpoint on sex toys. Sh! has also won the 2005 Erotic Awards Special Judges Award for being 'the best sex shop in town ~ possibly the world!' In 2007, Sh! was named in the g3 magazine Readers' Poll as 'Best Adult Store Online' and 'Best LGBT friendly business'. In 2008 the business was awarded the Readers' Poll 'Best Online Retailer' award.

References

Sex shops
British companies established in 1992
Retail companies established in 1992
Shops in London
Feminism and sexuality